is a passenger railway station located in the Noborito neighborhood of Tama-ku, Kawasaki, Kanagawa, Japan and operated by the private railway operator Odakyu Electric Railway.

Lines

Station layout
The station consists of two island platforms serving four tracks, which are connected to the station building by a footbridge.

Platforms

History
During the same year, a small steam train begins operating between this station and Mukogaoka-Yuen Amusement Park. The station was renamed to its present name in 1955. The steam locomotive service ceased in 1965, and then following year, the Mukōgaoka-Yūen Monorail began operations. This was discontinued in 2001, and the 
Mukōgaoka-Yūen Amusement Park ceased operations in 2002.

Station numbering was introduced in January 2014 with Noborito being assigned station number OH19.

Passenger statistics
In fiscal 2019, the station was used by an average of 67,384 passengers daily.

The passenger figures for previous years are as shown below.

Surrounding area
Fujiko F Fujio Museum
Nihon Minka-en
Senshu University
Taro Okamoto Museum of Art
Tama Ward Office

See also
 List of railway stations in Japan

References

External links

  

Odakyu Odawara Line
Railway stations in Kawasaki, Kanagawa
Railway stations in Japan opened in 1927